Nogometni klub Postojna, commonly referred to as NK Postojna or simply Postojna, was a Slovenian football club from Postojna.

Association football clubs established in 1920
1920 establishments in Slovenia
Association football clubs disestablished in 1999
Defunct football clubs in Slovenia
1999 disestablishments in Slovenia